Geraldina Bobbio (born 20 August 1967) is an Argentine alpine skier. She competed in the women's giant slalom at the 1984 Winter Olympics.

References

1967 births
Living people
Argentine female alpine skiers
Olympic alpine skiers of Argentina
Alpine skiers at the 1984 Winter Olympics
Skiers from Buenos Aires